Muhammad Khan Lehri is a Pakistani politician who was a Member of the Provincial Assembly of Balochistan, from August 2013 to May 2018, and again from 2018 till now

Political career

He was elected to the Provincial Assembly of Balochistan as a candidate of Pakistan Muslim League (N) from Constituency PB-29 Naseerabad-II in by-election held in August 2013.

He was re-elected to Provincial Assembly of Balochistan as a candidate of Balochistan Awami Party (BAP) from Constituency PB-12 (Nasirabad-II) in 2018 Pakistani general election.

References

Living people
Balochistan MPAs 2013–2018
Pakistan Muslim League (N) politicians
Balochistan Awami Party MPAs (Balochistan)
Balochistan MPAs 2018–2023
Year of birth missing (living people)